Allan Koury (22 November 1930 – 5 September 2004) was a member of the House of Commons of Canada from 1988 to 1993. He was proprietor of business Mercerie Allan for 55 years, and created the Societes d'initiatives et de développement d'arteres commerciales (SIDAC), an association dedicated to commercial development.

Koury was born in Sainte-Agathe-des-Monts, Quebec.

He was elected in the 1988 federal election at the Hochelaga—Maisonneuve electoral district for the Progressive Conservative party. He served in the 34th Canadian Parliament after which he was defeated by Bloc Québécois candidate Réal Ménard in the 1993 federal election.

Electoral record (partial)

Sources: Report of the Chief Electoral Officer, Thirty-fourth General Election, 1988; Report of the Chief Electoral Officer Respecting Election Expenses, 1988.

External links
 

1930 births
2004 deaths
Members of the House of Commons of Canada from Quebec
People from Sainte-Agathe-des-Monts
Progressive Conservative Party of Canada MPs
Canadian politicians of Lebanese descent